Cabucgayan (IPA: [kɐbʊk'gaɪɐn]), officially the Municipality of Cabucgayan,  is a 5th class municipality in the province of Biliran, Philippines. According to the 2020 census, it has a population of 21,542 people. The town's populace predominantly speaks Waray.

History
Cabucgayan derived its name from the snail called bukgay. In the Waray-Waray language, to make a singular noun into a plural noun, the article ka is added before the word and the article an after the word. Kabukgayan, therefore, means a place where there are many snails.

This municipality was created on September 29, 1949, when President Elpidio Quirino issued Executive Order no. 271.

Geography
Cabucgayan is bound on the north by Caibiran, east by the Villareal Bay, south by Carigara Bay, and west by the municipality of Biliran

According to the Philippine Statistics Authority, the municipality has a land area of  constituting  of the  total area of Biliran.

Barangays
Cabucgayan is politically subdivided into 13 barangays.

Climate

It belongs to the two types of climate, Type II and Type IV. It is characterized by pronounced rainfall periodically accompanied by trade winds and storms during the months of January, June, July, November and December while the minimum monthly rainfall occurs in February, March, April and May.

The three major forest products are timber, rattan and wild abaca.

Demographics

In the 2020 census, Cabucgayan had a population of 21,542.

Economy

References

External links
 [ Philippine Standard Geographic Code]

Municipalities of Biliran
Establishments by Philippine executive order